A series of fourteen films based on Sir Arthur Conan Doyle's Sherlock Holmes stories was released between 1939 and 1946; the British actors Basil Rathbone and Nigel Bruce played Holmes and Dr. John Watson, respectively. The first two films in the series were produced by 20th Century Fox and released in 1939. The studio stopped making the films after these, but Universal Pictures acquired the rights from the Doyle estate and produced a further twelve films.

Although the films from 20th Century Fox had large budget, high production values and were set in the Victorian era, Universal Pictures updated the films to have Holmes fighting the Nazis in the then-present day, and produced them as B pictures with lower budgets. Both Rathbone and Bruce continued their roles when the series changed studios, as did Mary Gordon, who played the recurring character Mrs Hudson.

In the 1970s four of the Universal-produced films fell into the public domain when their copyright was not renewed. These four films were restored and colourised. Some of the films in the series had become degraded over time, with some of the original negatives lost and others suffering from nitrate deterioration because of the unstable cellulose nitrate film. The UCLA Film and Television Archive restored the series, putting the films onto modern polyester film, in a process that was jointly paid for by UCLA, Warner Bros. and Hugh Hefner.

Background

In 1938, Basil Rathbone was cast as Sherlock Holmes for the 20th Century-Fox adaptation of The Hound of the Baskervilles; Nigel Bruce was chosen to play Dr. John Watson. Darryl F. Zanuck, Gregory Ratoff and Gene Markey made the choice of Rathbone as Holmes during a conversation at a party in Hollywood. Filming began on 29 December 1938 under the direction of Sidney Lanfield and the film was released on 31 March 1939. Later that year a second film, The Adventures of Sherlock Holmes, followed, which was based on Sherlock Holmes, an 1899 stage play written by William Gillette. Although Fox planned to make further Holmes films with Rathbone and Bruce, complications in negotiations between the company and the estate of the character's creator, Sir Arthur Conan Doyle, brought a premature end to the studio's involvement; their decision to withdraw from further productions was also because the Second World War meant that "foreign agents and spies were much more typical and topical than the antiquated criminal activities of Moriarty and the like". On 2 October 1939, a month after the release of Adventures, Rathbone and Bruce resumed their roles on radio, in The New Adventures of Sherlock Holmes, with episodes written by Dennis Green and Anthony Boucher. Rathbone left the radio series in May 1946, while Bruce remained until 1947, with Tom Conway replacing Rathbone.

In February 1942, following negotiations with the Doyle estate, Universal Pictures acquired the rights to the films and signed contracts with Rathbone and Bruce to continue their portrayals. Universal's deal—worth $300,000—was for seven years, and they purchased the rights to 21 stories in the canon in a contract that stipulated that the company had to make three films a year, of which two had to be adaptations of Doyle's stories. Universal was allowed to substantially revise the adaptations and modernise them, often to the point where little of the original story remained recognisable. Universal decided to update the stories to a Second World War setting, and the first film, Sherlock Holmes and the Voice of Terror—based on Doyle's 1917 story "His Last Bow"—was updated to a Second World War setting, with Holmes attempting to capture a Nazi agent. Bruce and Rathbone initially objected to updating the setting of the stories. The change of era for Holmes is explained in the opening titles, with a caption that informs viewers that Holmes is "ageless, invincible and unchanging", going on to say that he was "solving significant problems of the present day".

While the Fox adaptations had high production values and larger budgets, the Universal films changed the approach of the series, and aimed "simply to be entertaining 'B' pictures". The second film produced by Universal, Sherlock Holmes and the Secret Weapon, was directed by Roy William Neill; he went on to direct the remaining ten films—and produce the final nine—in the Universal series.

Rathbone became frustrated with the role of Holmes and left the series in 1946; he stated that his "first picture was, as it were, a negative from which I merely continued to produce endless positives of the same photograph". Universal considered replacing him on screen with Tom Conway—as they subsequently did with the radio series—but instead decided to end the series, despite still having the rights for the next three years. In December 1946, shortly after the end of the series, Neill died of a heart attack.

Cast

The writer David Stuart Davies concluded that Basil Rathbone was "the actor who has come closest to creating the definitive Sherlock Holmes on screen", also describing the choice as "inspired". The historian Alan Barnes agrees, and wrote that "Rathbone was Sherlock Holmes". The choice of Nigel Bruce as Watson was more contentious, with Davies pointing out that "Bruce's characterisation bore little relation" to the written Watson, even though the portrayal eventually produced "an endearingly avuncular figure". The historian David Parkinson agrees, and wrote that Bruce's "avuncular presence provided the perfect counterbalance to Rathbone's briskly omniscient sleuth". Barnes notes that, despite the criticisms against him, Bruce rehabilitated Watson, who had been a marginal figure in the cinematic Holmes canon to that point: "after Bruce, it would be a near-unthinkable heresy to show Holmes without him". With the combination of Rathbone and Bruce, the historian Jim Harmon considered that this was "near perfect casting".

The series included continuity of two actors playing recurring characters: Mary Gordon, who played Mrs. Hudson, and Dennis Hoey, who portrayed Inspector Lestrade. Other recurring characters were played by numerous actors, with Professor Moriarty being played by three people: Lionel Atwill in Sherlock Holmes and the Secret Weapon, Henry Daniell in The Woman in Green and George Zucco in The Adventures of Sherlock Holmes. Some supporting actors reappeared in a number of roles in what Davies called the series' "own little repertory company of actors"; these included Harry Cording, who played seven roles in different films, and Gerald Hamer and Harold De Becker, who both played four roles, among others.

Complete film list

Colour versions and restoration

Four of the films—Sherlock Holmes and the Secret Weapon, The Woman in Green, Terror by Night and Dressed to Kill—are in the public domain. In 2006 the four films were digitally restored and computer colourised by Legend Films, who released the colour and black and white films on DVDs.

The two 20th Century Fox films—The Hound of the Baskervilles and The Adventures of Sherlock Holmes—had survived complete and in good condition, but those in the Universal series suffered badly over the years, as they passed through the hands of different copyright owners. In 1993 the UCLA Film and Television Archive started a restoration project on the series after the unstable cellulose nitrate film was found to be suffering from deterioration. Restoration on the first six films—The Woman in Green, The Pearl of Death, Sherlock Holmes and the Secret Weapon, The Scarlet Claw, Terror by Night and The Spider Woman—took four years from 1993; the costs for the restoration were met by UCLA and Hugh Hefner, who was a fan of the Rathbone-Holmes series. From 1998 Warner Bros. matched Hefner's funding and the remaining six films—Dressed to Kill, Pursuit to Algiers, Sherlock Holmes Faces Death, The House of Fear, Sherlock Holmes and the Voice of Terror and Sherlock Holmes in Washington—were then restored, a process that was completed in 2001.

The restoration involved transferring the films onto modern polyester film and restoring the images frame-by-frame. The process was complicated by the poor quality of some of the films. Robert Gitt, the UCLA Preservation Officer, commented that "the copies of the films that survive are many generations removed from the original and flaws have been photographed and re-photographed into these copies". The Scarlet Claw and Pursuit to Algiers were both in very poor condition and Dressed to Kill was missing some 35mm reels. This being the case, the restorers had to blow up some 16mm prints to replace the scenes.

Notes and references

Notes

References

Sources

External links
 The Basil Rathbone Sherlock Holmes films on the Internet Movie Database
 

English-language films
Sherlock Holmes film series
American mystery films
Film series introduced in 1939